Oak Hill Park Historic District is a historic district located at Olean in Cattaraugus County, New York. The  district encompasses 89 properties including 82 residences, two churches, one school (the Olean High School), and a landscape design. There are 76 contributing buildings.  The structures reflect a variety of mid-late 19th-century and early 20th-century architectural styles including Queen Anne, Italianate, and Gothic Revival styles.  The structures were constructed between about 1849 and 1937.

It was listed on the National Register of Historic Places in 1997.

References

Historic districts on the National Register of Historic Places in New York (state)
Queen Anne architecture in New York (state)
Italianate architecture in New York (state)
Greek Revival architecture in New York (state)
Historic districts in Cattaraugus County, New York
National Register of Historic Places in Cattaraugus County, New York